Blaine is an unincorporated community in Latah County, in the U.S. state of Idaho.

History
Blaine contained a post office from 1882 until 1887. The community was originally built up chiefly by Scandinavians.

References

Unincorporated communities in Latah County, Idaho
Unincorporated communities in Idaho